Valea Rece may refer to the following places in Romania:

 Valea Rece, a village in Lunca de Jos commune, Harghita County
 Valea Rece, a village in Band commune, Mureș County
 Valea Rece, a tributary of the Bistrița in Vâlcea County
 Valea Rece, a tributary of the Borșa in Cluj County
 Valea Rece, a tributary of the Crișul Repede in Bihor County
 Valea Rece, a tributary of the Cheia in Vâlcea County
 Valea Rece (Trotuș), a tributary of the Trotuș in Harghita County
 Valea Rece de Jos, a tributary of the Doftana in Brașov County

See also
 Valea (disambiguation)